Zhala Mahsimova (born 2 September 1996),  is an Azerbaijani footballer, who plays as a midfielder for Turkish Women's Football Super League club Kdz. Ereğli Belediye Spor, and the Azerbaijan women's national team.

Club career 
In November 2021, she moved to Turkey and joined the Gaziantep-based club ALG Spor. She enjoyed the 2021-22 Women's Super League champions title of her team ALG Spor.

In the 2022-23 Women's Super League season, she transferred to Kdz. Ereğli Belediye Spor.

Honours 
 Turkish Women's Super League
 ALG Spor
 Winners (1): 2021-22

See also 
List of Azerbaijan women's international footballers

References 

1996 births
Living people
Azerbaijani women's footballers
Women's association football midfielders
Russian Women's Football Championship players
Azerbaijan women's international footballers
Azerbaijani expatriate  footballers
Azerbaijani expatriate sportspeople in Russia
Expatriate women's footballers in Russia
ZFK Zenit Saint Petersburg players
Azerbaijani expatriate sportspeople in Turkey
Expatriate women's footballers in Turkey
Turkish Women's Football Super League players
ALG Spor players
Karadeniz Ereğlispor players